The Late Silurian Tonoloway Formation is a mapped limestone bedrock unit in Pennsylvania, Maryland, Virginia and West Virginia. The Tonoloway is roughly equivalent to the Salina group that is found to the north and west.

Description
The basal 50 m consists of medium-dark-gray laminated to thin-bedded calcisiltite with shale partings and interbeds. Overlying 5 m are light-yellowish-gray to olive-gray mudstone and shale. Above this interval are 75 m of laminated calcisiltite with interbeds of thick to very thick bedded calcisiltite. The remainder of the formation is cyclic, consisting of three or four resistant ledges of laminated limestone and shale. Uppermost 20 m contains a variety of limestones. Lower contact with the Wills Creek is probably conformable. Upper contact is conformable and undulatory, occurring at the base of the "calico" limestone of the Keyser Formation.

Depositional environment
The depositional environment of the Tonoloway is interpreted as shallow marine.

Notable exposures
 Tonoloway Ridge (type section), in Pennsylvania, Maryland, and West Virginia.
 Along Little Juniata River, 2 km northeast of Bellwood, Pennsylvania
 Blue Rock, and other large outcroppings, in the Smoke Hole Canyon of eastern West Virginia
 Trout Pond, in Hardy County, West Virginia

Age
Relative age dating places the Tonoloway in the late Silurian.

References 

Geologic formations of Pennsylvania
Silurian Maryland
Silurian geology of Virginia
Silurian West Virginia
Pridoli geology
Limestone formations of the United States
Silurian south paleopolar deposits
Silurian southern paleotemperate deposits